Kelly is an unincorporated community in Caldwell Parish, Louisiana, United States. Its ZIP code is 71441.

Notes

Unincorporated communities in Caldwell Parish, Louisiana
Unincorporated communities in Louisiana